Ba Son Station is a future underground Ho Chi Minh City Metro station on Line 1. Located in District 1 at the site of the former Ba Son Shipyard, the station is planned to open in 2024.

References 

Ho Chi Minh City Metro stations
Proposed buildings and structures in Vietnam
Railway stations scheduled to open in 2024